Maria de Belém Roseira Martins Coelho Henriques de Pina, GCC (born 28 July 1949) is a Portuguese politician who served as President of the Socialist Party from 2011 to 2014. She is informally known as Maria de Belém, or, more commonly, Maria de Belém Roseira.

She graduated in Law at the University of Coimbra in 1972.

She was Minister of Health (1995–1999) in the first government of António Guterres, and Minister for Equality (1999–2000) early in his second government.

In December 2006, while she was still President of the Parliamentary Health Commission, she was hired as a consultant by Espírito Santo Saúde, a private health provider. She stated that she did not consider there would be any conflict of interest holding both roles simultaneously  In 2015, while she was still a member of parliament, she was put forward as a member of the Executive Council of the Board of Governors of Luz Saúde, (formerly Espírito Santo Saúde).

More recently, she was a candidate on the 2016 Portuguese presidential election, but received only 4.26% of the votes, losing to Marcelo Rebelo de Sousa, and not being supported as the official candidate of her party.

References

1949 births
Living people
Government ministers of Portugal
Health ministers of Portugal
People from Porto
Socialist Party (Portugal) politicians
University of Coimbra alumni
Women government ministers of Portugal